Petrosal nerve may refer to:

Deep petrosal nerve
Derived from the symp. plexus around I.C.A.
-Unite with the greater superficial petrosal n. (parasymp.)
To form the nerve of pterygoid canal (vidian n. ) which 
passes through the pterygoid canal to reach the spheno-
palatine ganglion
-Enter the spheno-palatine ganglion in the pterygo-palatine 
fossa (no relay)
Greater petrosal nerve (also known as the greater superficial petrosal nerve)

-Parasymp. N. from nervus intermedius
-Origin: geniculate ganglion of facial n.
-Course:
Leave petrous bone via its hiatus to reach middle cranial 
fossa
Then run in its groove to enter f.lacerum to join with deep 
petrosal n. to form n. to pterygoid canal ( vidian n.)
-vidian n. run to reach pterygopalatine fossa
-in fossa the parasymp. Fiber of G.S. petrosal n. relay in 
sphenopalatine ganglion
Post ganglionic fibers supply :
Mucous gland of palat , nose , nasophartnx & lacrimal gland

Lesser petrosal nerve (also known as the lesser superficial petrosal nerve) from the geniculate ganglion to the otic ganglion
Arise from the tympanic plexus
reach the middle cranial fossa by foramen carry its name
-then passes through foramen ovale to reach the infra-
temporal fossa to relay in the otic ganglion
-The post.ganglionic fibers joins with auriculo temporal nerve 
to reach the parotid gland

See also 
Petrosal (disambiguation)